"Got a Hold on Me" is a song by Christine McVie, released as the lead single from her eponymous second solo album in 1984.

The song reached #10 on the Billboard Hot 100 chart, and topped the Billboard Adult Contemporary and Rock Tracks charts for four and two weeks, respectively. The song was McVie's only top 10 solo hit in the United States.

Synthesizers on the track were played by Steve Winwood, while the guitars were played by Todd Sharp (the song's co-writer) and McVie's Fleetwood Mac bandmate Lindsey Buckingham. The other musicians were bassist George Hawkins and drummer-percussionist Steve Ferrone.

The video for the song was produced and directed by Jon Roseman. Shot in both black-and-white and color, it is a pseudo-performance video showing Christine McVie in a mansion-like room singing at her piano while a backup band appears in silhouette shadows on the walls around her.

Personnel 
 Christine McVie – lead and backing vocals, keyboards, percussion 
 Steve Winwood – synthesizers 
 Lindsey Buckingham – guitar
 Todd Sharp – guitar, backing vocals 
 George Hawkins – bass, backing vocals 
 Steve Ferrone – drums, percussion

Charts

Weekly charts

Year-end charts

See also
List of number-one adult contemporary singles of 1984 (U.S.)
List of Billboard Mainstream Rock number-one songs of the 1980s

References

1984 songs
1984 singles
Songs written by Christine McVie
Warner Records singles
Song recordings produced by Russ Titelman
Christine_McVie songs